The  was an automated people mover used in Narita International Airport, Narita, Chiba Japan. The system operated between December 6, 1992 and 2013.

History
The Shuttle System opened in 1992 with the opening of Terminal 2 of Narita International Airport, the international airport serving the Greater Tokyo Area. The shuttle linked the main building of the terminal and its satellite, 279 metres away. The whole ride took a minute, and was free of charge.

The system was made by Nippon Otis Elevator, a company specialising in elevators and escalators. It was technically (and legally) not a railway, but a horizontal elevator; cars were attached to a cable that moved them, like a funicular. The cars did not have wheels; instead, they floated on a 0.2-mm layer of compressed air. This was the first use of such a system to be used in an airport, as well as the first in Japan.

A new walkway between the main and satellite buildings had opened on September 27, 2013, whereafter the people mover ceased operations. The space formerly used by the shuttle was converted into moving walkways and shops.

See also
List of airport people mover systems
U-Bahn Serfaus
Hovertrain
Tracked Hovercraft
Aérotrain

References

External links

 Narita International Airport official website

Airport people mover systems
Hovair people movers
Narita International Airport
People mover systems in Japan
Funicular railways in Japan
1992 establishments in Japan
2013 disestablishments in Japan